Czarny Piec  is a village in the administrative district of Gmina Jedwabno, within Szczytno County, Warmian-Masurian Voivodeship, in northern Poland.

The village has a population of 25.

References

Czarny Piec